"I Would Like to See You Again" is a song written by Charlie Craig and Larry Atwood.

Kenny Rogers recorded it for his first solo album Love Lifted Me, produced by Larry Butler for United Artists Records.

The album, released in 1976, turned out, according to Kenny Rogers himself, "pretty much enevenful", yet, as C. Eric Banister put it in his book Johnny Cash FAQ: All That's Left to Know About the Man in Black, "it included several decent songs, one of which was 'I Would Like to See You Again'" that would later be covered by Johnny Cash.

Another known version of this song is by Del Reeves, it is included on his 1975 album With Strings and Things, produced by Butler as well.

Another cover was done by Don Williams. It was released as a B-side to his hit single "Lay Down Beside Me" in March 1979, and was the opening track  for his 1978 album, Expressions.

Johnny Cash version 
Cash's version gave its title to his Larry-Butler-produced album I Would Like to See You Again, released in April 1978.

It is a "thoughtful, nostalgic ballad".

Put out as a single (Columbia 3-10681, with "Lately" on the opposite side) from the  upcoming album in February or March 1978, the song spent 13 weeks on U.S. Billboard country chart, reaching number 12.

Track listing

Charts

References

External links 
 "I Would Like to See You Again" on the Johnny Cash official website

1976 songs
Kenny Rogers songs
Johnny Cash songs
1978 singles
Songs written by Charlie Craig
Columbia Records singles
American country music songs